Furio Niclot Doglio, MOVM (24 April 1908 – 27 July 1942) was an Italian test pilot and World War II fighter pilot in the Regia Aeronautica. Doglio set nine world aviation records in the 1930s during his time as a test pilot. During the war, he claimed seven kills (six of them Spitfires), flying FIAT G. 50s and Macchi C. 202s, establishing himself as one of Italy's aces. Doglio was killed in combat on 27 July 1942 during the Siege of Malta by George Beurling, who became Canada's top ace of the war. He was awarded a Medaglia d'oro al Valor Militare alla memoria (Memorial Golden medal for military valour).

Early life
Furio Niclot Doglio was born in Turin, Piedmont. He qualified as a civil pilot in 1930, having previously been an aeronautical engineer. During the early to mid-1930s, he worked as a test pilot for Italian aircraft manufacturers Compagnia Nazionale Aeronautica (CNA) and Breda and was also a flying instructor at Littorio airport, Rome.

Records
Doglio set nine official aviation world records (as recognized by the Fédération Aéronautique Internationale or FAI, the aviation world record adjudicating body).

World War II
When Italy entered World War II on 10 June 1940, Doglio enlisted in the Regia Aeronautica.  His first posting was the 355ª Squadriglia of 21° Gruppo. On 17 June, Niclot flew his first mission: a patrol over Rome, flying the Fiat G.50.

Corpo Aereo Italiano
In autumn 1940, Doglio was in Belgium with the Corpo Aereo Italiano, the Italian air expedition against England. Niclot carried out his first mission on 27 October, by escorting a Fiat BR.20, on a mission to attack Ramsgate. During the whole campaign, Niclot, like the other Italian G.50 pilots, did not encounter enemy fighters, nor fire his guns.

North Africa

Doglio's first "kill" was a Hawker Hurricane, in North Africa, while he was flying a Fiat G.50. On 30 June 1941, Captain Furio Niclot Doglio, while escorting Ju 87 Stukas that were bombing an English convoy off Ras Azzas, attacked three Hurricanes that were bouncing the dive-bombers and shot down one, damaging the others. For this action, Niclot received a Medaglia di bronzo al Valore Militare (Bronze Medal for Military Valour).

Malta
Doglio's other air victories were all claimed at Malta in July 1942, while flying the Macchi C.202, as Capitano of 151ª Squadriglia. His first Spitfire was shot down on 2 July 1942. That day, while escorting three Savoia-Marchetti SM.84, leading 10 MC.202s of 151ª Squadriglia, Doglio fought with Spitfires from 249 and 185 Squadron. During a head-on attack, he hit the Spitfire BR377 of Flight Sergeant C.S.G. De Nancrede from Squadron 249, that had to crash-land on Ta 'Qali airfield, near Mdina.

On the 6th, Doglio encountered again the Spitfires of 249 Squadron, while escorting three Cant.Z.1007 bis, and he claimed another Supermarine fighter, confirmed by his wingman Tarantola to crash north of Valletta, but the 249 that day had no losses, even if the Squadron had two aircraft shot up, one of them was flown by Sgt. Beurling, who three weeks later would kill Doglio in combat over Gozo. The following day, Niclot and seven other Macchi pilots were escorting for the first time the Ju 88A-4 of Kampfgeschwader 77. In the sky over Luqa, they clashed with seven Spitfires. Niclot and his wingman shot down the Spitfire of Flt. Sgt. D. Ferraby from Squadron 249 (AB500). Niclot's last air victory was a double "kill": two Spitfires downed on 13 July 1942.

On 27 July 1942, Doglio was leading three others Macchi, on the coast of Gozo. Six Spitfires of 126 Squadron attacked them head-on, while eight other Spitfires of 249 Sq. attacked from left ("10 hour direction"). Niclot was preparing to counter-attack the Spitfires or 126 Sq. when his wingman, Sergente Ennio Tarantola, tried to warn his commander, waggling his wings, as Italian radios worked badly, of the Spitfires diving on them from the left, but Niclot understood that Tarantola was warning him of the Spitfires he had already spotted. 

Fl. Sgt. George "Screwball" Beurling, from 249 Sq., first scored hits on Sergente Faliero Gelli's aircraft, who later crash landed on Gozo, and soon after shot down Doglio's C.202 (MM 9042), who was waggling his wings to warn his fellow pilots of Spitfires closing "head-on". "The poor devil simply blew to pieces in the air", Beurling recalled the following year, writing the book Malta Spitfire, together with journalist Leslie Roberts.

When he was killed, Doglio held the rank of Capitano and was the commanding officer of 151ª Squadriglia, 20° Gruppo, 51° Stormo, and was flying a Macchi C.202, aircraft number 151-1. In less than a month, July 1942, Niclot had flown 21 missions of war, over Malta, was involved in 18 air combats, claimed six aircraft shot down plus four more probable and two shared with his wingman, Ennio Tarantola.

Doglio left a wife and two sons, Stefano and Gian Francesco, doctors, who are still alive and live in Northern Italy. In via Ravenna 7A, near piazza Bologna, Rome, the house where Niclot lived with his family on the first floor, is still standing.

Honors and tributes
In Rome, in the entrance of the building built by himself and his father, in via Bolzano 14, a plaque in the hall displays the citation from Doglio's . In Fiumicino, near Rome, a street in the area of Isola Sacra is named: "Niclot".

Awards
In 1936, Doglio became one of the first recipients of the FAI's Louis Blériot medal. Doglio was awarded the Medaglia d'oro al Valore Militare (MOVM) (Gold Medal for Military Valor), a Silver medal of aeronautical valour, a Silver Medal of Military Valor "on the field", two  and the Iron Cross, Second Class (EK II. Klasse).

See also
List of World War II aces from Italy

References
Notes

Bibliography

 Beurling, George and Leslie Roberrts. Malta Spitfire: The Diary of a Fighter Pilot. London: Stackpole Books, 2002. .
 Cull, Brian with Frederick Galea. 249 at Malta: Malta top-scoring Fighter Squadron 1941-1943. Malta: Wise Owl Publication, 2004. .
 Cull, Brian with Frederick Galea. "Spitfires over Malta". London: Grub Street, 2006. .
 Massimello, Giovanni. Furio Niclot Doglio: Un Pilota Indimenticabile (in Italian and English). Milan: Giorgio Apostolo, 1998.
 Nolan, Brian. Hero: The Buzz Beurling Story. London: Penguin Books, 1981. .
 Massimello, Giovanni and Giorgio Apostolo. Italian Aces of World War Two. Oxford: Osprey Publishing, 2000. .

External links
Google translation of account of Doglio's death
History site which includes two photos of Doglio

1908 births
1942 deaths
Italian World War II flying aces
Military personnel from Turin
Recipients of the Gold Medal of Military Valor
Recipients of the Silver Medal of Military Valor
Recipients of the Iron Cross (1939), 2nd class
Italian military personnel killed in World War II
Italian aviation record holders
Aviators killed by being shot down